The 1973 NCAA Division I Cross Country Championships were the 35th annual cross country meet to determine the team and individual national champions of NCAA Division I men's collegiate cross country running in the United States. Held on  it was hosted by Washington State University at Hangman Valley Golf Course, near Spokane, Washington.

The team national championship was won by the Oregon Ducks, their second title.

The individual championship was won by Oregon's Steve Prefontaine, with a time of 28:14.80. This was Prefontaine's third individual title in four years. Along with Gerry Lindgren (1966, 1967, and 1969) and Henry Rono (1976, 1977, and 1979), both from Washington State, Prefontaine is one of only three Division I collegiate runners with three individual titles.  

Washington State hosted the championship again four years later in 1977, also at Hangman Valley, south of the city.

Qualification
All Division I members were eligible to qualify for the meet. In total, 22 teams and 210 individual runners contested this championship. This was the first championship after the NCAA rebranded the former University Division as Division I in 1973. On a related note, the inaugural NCAA Men's Division III Cross Country Championship was held this year at Wheaton College in Wheaton, Illinois.

Men's title
Distance:

Team Result (Top 10)

See also
NCAA Men's Division II Cross Country Championship 
NCAA Men's Division III Cross Country Championship (began in 1973)

References
 

NCAA Cross Country Championships
NCAA Division I Cross Country Championships
NCAA Division I Cross Country Championships
NCAA Division I Cross Country Championships
Sports competitions in Spokane, Washington
Track and field in Washington (state)
Washington State University